Templemania is a genus of moths belonging to the subfamily Tortricinae of the family Tortricidae.

Species
Templemania animosana (Busck, 1907)
Templemania millistriata (Walsingham, 1914)
Templemania rhythmogramma (Meyrick, 1924)
Templemania sarothrura (Felder & Rogenhofer, 1875)

See also
List of Tortricidae genera

References

 , 2005: World catalogue of insects volume 5 Tortricidae.

External links
tortricidae.com

Atteriini
Tortricidae genera